Ikraar is a 1979 Bollywood film directed  by Kailash Advani and starring Rakesh Roshan, Rameshwari, Aruna Irani, Amrish Puri and Surendra Kumar. The film's music is composed by Bappi Lahiri, "Humse Nazar To Milao" became a hit. It earned singer Usha Mangeshkar a nomination at Filmfare Awards for Best Female Playback Singer.

Soundtrack
Lyrics by Kulwant Jani.
"Sathi Re Gham Nahi Karna" - Savita Suman, Mohammed Rafi
"Tum Samne Baithe Raho" - Lata Mangeshkar
"Humse Nazar To Milao" - Usha Mangeshkar
"Piano Music (Iqraar)"

Awards

References

External links

1979 films
1970s Hindi-language films
Films scored by Bappi Lahiri